Aureum Chaos is a rough, collapsed region (chaos terrain) in the Margaritifer Sinus quadrangle (MC-19) portion of the planet Mars at approximately 4.4° south latitude and 27° west longitude, it is also in the west of Margaritifer Terra. It is 368 km across and was named after a classical albedo feature name.

The classic name came from one of the first maps of Mars drawn by Schiaparelli who has been called the "Father of Mars."  He called a feature "Aurea Cherso, which translates to the golden peninsula—an ancient name for Malaya.  Aureum is the Latin word for gold.  In chemistry, the symbol for gold is Au from gold's Latin name.

In many places, the canyons of Aureum Chaos are about 1 km deep—a little more than half the depth of the Grand Canyon.  But, Aureum Chaos covers an area about the size of the state of Alabama, almost 20 times larger than the Grand Canyon National Park.

Description

Aureum Chaos is a major canyon system and collapsed area.  Large outflow channels on Mars are believed to be caused by catastrophic discharges of ground water. Many of the channels begin in chaotic terrain, where the ground has apparently collapsed.  In the collapsed section, blocks of undisturbed material can be seen.  The OMEGA experiment on Mars Express discovered  clay minerals (phyllosilicates) in a variety places in Aureum Chaos. Clay minerals need water to form, so the area may once have contained large amounts of water.  Scientists are interested in determining what parts of Mars contained water because evidence of past or present life may be found there. Aureum Chaos is one more piece of evidence that Mars once had great amounts of water.

Gallery

See also 
 List of areas of chaos terrain on Mars

References

External links

The mesas of Aureum Chaos with Mars Express

Margaritifer Sinus quadrangle
Chaotic terrains on Mars